

Highest-grossing films

List of films
A list of films released in Japan in 2000 (see 2000 in film).

See also
2000 in Japan
2000 in Japanese television

Footnotes

References

External links
 Japanese films of 2000 at the Internet Movie Database

2000
Japanese
Films